Corte Franca is a town and comune in the province of Brescia, in Lombardy.

Twin cities/towns
 - Aberdour, Fife, Scotland (since 31 July 2004).

References

Cities and towns in Lombardy